Susan Maree Trindall (born 5 May 1983) is an Australian sport shooter. She has won a career tally of five medals, including a gold in women's double trap shooting under junior division at the 2001 ISSF World Championships in Cairo, Egypt, and had a golden opportunity to represent Australia at the 2004 Summer Olympics in Athens. Trindall is also a member of Showman's Clay Target Shooting Range and the Australian Clay Target Shooting Association, where she trains full-time under head coach Greg Chan.

Born in Brisbane, Trindall made her first and only Australian squad, along with teammate Suzanne Balogh in the women's double trap at the 2004 Summer Olympics in Athens. She achieved a minimum qualifying score of 102 to fill out one of the Olympic places awarded to the Aussie team at the 2003 ISSF World Cup meet in Granada, Spain. Trindall shot 107 hits out of 120 to force a seventh-place tie with Chinese Taipei's Lin Yi-chun in the qualifying round, narrowly missing out the final by just a single target.

References

External links
ISSF Profile
Australian Olympic Team Bio

1983 births
Living people
Australian female sport shooters
Olympic shooters of Australia
Shooters at the 2004 Summer Olympics
Shooters at the 2002 Commonwealth Games
Shooters at the 2006 Commonwealth Games
Sportspeople from Brisbane
Commonwealth Games medallists in shooting
Commonwealth Games bronze medallists for Australia
20th-century Australian women
21st-century Australian women
Medallists at the 2006 Commonwealth Games